This is a list of major ships of the Ottoman Steam Navy:

Wooden-hulled warships

Ship of the line (Kalyon)

Peyk-i Zafer (screw ship of the line)

Kosova (screw ship of the line)

Fethiye class (screw ship of the line)

Frigate (Fırkateyn)

Mecidiye class (paddle frigate)

Muhbir-i Sürûr (screw frigate)

Kervan-i Bahri (steam frigate)

Ertuğrul (steam frigate)

Hüdâvendigâr class (screw frigate)

Selimiye (steam frigate)

Peyk-i Meserret class (screw frigate)

Mehmed Selîm (steam frigate)

Corvette (Korvet)

Eser-i Cedîd (paddle corvette)

Sinop class (screw corvette)

Beyrût class (screw corvette)

Mansûre class (screw corvette)

Heybet Nümâ (corvette)

Zuhâf class (corvette)

Armoured warships

Armoured frigate (Zırhlı fırkateyn)

Osmaniye class (broadside ironclad)

Fâtih (broadside ironclad)

Fettâh (broadside ironclad)

Mesûdiye (central battery ironclad)

Mahmûdiye (central battery ironclad)

Hamidiye (central battery ironclad)

Peyk-i Şeref class (armoured ram)

Armoured corvette (Zırhlı korvet)

Asar-ı Tevfik (barbette battery ironclad)

Asar-ı Şevket class (barbette battery ironclad)

Lütf-i Celil class (coast defense turret ship)

Avnillah class (casemate ironclad)

Feth-i Bülend (casemate ironclad)

Mukaddeme-i Hayir (casemate ironclad)

Iclaliye (barbette battery ironclad)

River monitor (Zırhlı Duba)

Feth-ül İslâm class

Hizber class

Battleships

Abdül Kadir (battleship)

Turgut Reis class (battleship)

Reşadiye class (battleship)

Sultân Osmân-ı Evvel (battleship)

Yavûz Sultân Selîm (battlecruiser)

Cruiser (Kruvazör)

Ottoman cruiser Lütf-ü Hümayun (3rd class unprotected cruiser)

Feyzâ-i Bahri class (cruiser)

Hüdâvendigâr class (unprotected cruiser)

Peyk-i Şevket class (torpedo cruiser)

Mecidiye (protected cruiser)

Hamidiye (protected cruiser)

Drama (protected cruiser)

Midilli (light cruiser)

Armstrong type scout cruiser

Torpedo boats

Torpedo steam boat (Torpido stimbotu)

Burhâneddîn class (2nd class torpedo boat)

Mecidiye class (2nd class torpedo boat)

Timsah (3rd class torpedo boat)

Şemşir-i Hücûm (3rd class torpedo boat)

Torpedo boat (Torpido botu)

Mahabbet class

Gilyum class

Nâsır class

Ejder

Berk Efşân class

Hamidiye class

Akhisar class

Antalya class

Demirhisar class

Destroyer (Muhrip)

Samsun class

Muâvenet-i Millîye class

Normand type

Hawthorn Leslie type 

Four 1100 ton class destroyer were ordered from Armstrong and subcontracted by Armstrong to Hawthorn Leslie. Material prepared for them was used for M-class destroyer  (ordered in 1914 launched in 1916 and sold in 1921).

Impavido class 

Four 700 ton class destroyers were ordered from Orlando, shortly before the war. But works were never begun.

Unknown 

Six fast destroyers were authorized in March 1917. But works were never begun.

Submarine (Denizaltı)

Abdül Hamid class (Nordenfelt type)

Laubeuf type 

Two submarines were ordered from in April 1914 Schneider-Laubeuf design to be delivered by December 1915.

E class 

Müstecib Onbaşı

Sources

External links 
 Naval History, Turkish or Ottoman Navy
 Destroyers of the Ottoman Navy (1909–1918), Big Bad Battleships
 Digger History

List of naval steamships
Naval steamships